Prince Konstanty Wiśniowiecki (1564–1641) was a Ruthenian nobleman of Kingdom of Poland, voivode of Belz since 1636, of Ruthenia since 1638 and starost of Czerkasy and Kamieniec was a wealthy, powerful and influential magnate, experienced in both politics and warfare.

Marriage and issue
He was married four times:
 circa 1583 Anna Zahorowska Korczak; had issue
 son Janusz Wiśniowiecki (1598–1636), daughters Helena Wiśniowiecka (married Stanisław Warszycki) and Marianna Wiśniowiecka (1600–1624; married Jakub Sobieski)
 1603 Urszula Mniszech, sister of Maryna Mniszech; had issue
 sons Jerzy Wiśniowiecki (died 1641) and Aleksander Wiśniowiecki (died 1638/39), daughter Teofila Wiśniowiecka
 1626/28 Katarzyna Korniaktowna (died circa 1635); no issue – daughter of Konstanty Korniakt h. Krucyni
 Krystyna Strusiowna h. Korczak (died after 1647); no issue

Wiśniowiecki outlived all of his three sons; after his death, his estate was inherited by Prince Jeremi Wiśniowiecki.

Bibliography
 Czamańska I., Wiśniowieccy. Monografia rodu, Wydawnictwo Poznańskie, Poznań 2007, s. 147–155.

References

1564 births
1641 deaths
Konstanty
Secular senators of the Polish–Lithuanian Commonwealth